Parolini is a surname. Notable people with the surname include:

Giacomo Parolini (1663–1733), Italian painter 
Gianfranco Parolini (born 1925), Italian film director
Marilù Parolini (1931-2012), Italian photographer and screenwriter
Pio Parolini (born 1940), Swiss ice hockey player